Bunjies Coffee House & Folk Cellar was a cafe situated at 27 Litchfield Street (just off Charing Cross Road), London WC2. Opened in 1953 or 1954, it was one of the original folk cafés of the 1950s and 1960s. Below the café, in a 400-year-old wine cellar, was an influential music venue which changed little until its closure (and conversion of the premises into a restaurant) in 1999. Allegedly named after the first owner's pet hamster, the venue featured, early in their careers, Tom Paxton, John Renbourn, Bert Jansch, Bob Dylan and Paul Simon. Al Stewart secured a residency at the Folk Cellar in 1965, at the age of 19, which was a significant factor in his later success.

During the 1960s the venue was run by two brothers, Leo and Theo Johnson and, at this time, a range of artists more associated with mainstream pop music than folk happily performed to tiny audiences in the confines of the cellar; Phil Collins, Sandie Shaw, Cat Stevens, Art Garfunkel, Rod Stewart, Long John Baldry, Amory Kane, and David Bowie being amongst them.

In the early sixties, the Coffee House was owned by Lou Hart, and Wednesday night in the cellar was run by Bob Wilson, an art student at St Martins, and Leonore Drewry. Bob finally returned to Staffordshire and Leonore became the resident folksinger at the Ambiance Restaurant in Bayswater.  The club was left in the hands of Bert Jansch, newly down from Edinburgh, and Charles Pearce, an art student at the Central School. During this time, a new generation of singers and musicians would come in and play: Ramblin' Jack Elliott, Derroll Adams, Diz Disley and many more including composer John Palmer who played there as a young songwriter in the late 1970s.

Bunjies was also a haunt of many writers, comedians and artists. Regulars have included Jarvis Cocker of Pulp.

Other London folk cafés of the 1950s and 1960s included Les Cousins and The Troubadour.

References

Further reading
"Rock Music Landmarks of London" by Graham Vickers

External links
Classic Cafés

British culture
Music venues in London
Folk music venues